Sir Hugh Crawford (1195–1265) was the Second Sheriff of Ayr, Chief of Clan Crawford, and Lord of Loudoun. He probably lived in Loudon Castle even while he administrated quite some distance away in the town of Ayr. But Norse control over traditional Scots in the Western Isles and the underhanded way in which they gained control had been an aggravation to the Scots for years. Alexander III of Scotland began pressing diplomatically and militarily to regain control beginning in 1260. This prompted Haakon IV of Norway to lead a large fleet in 1263 to the maritime boundary between the jurisdictions located along the northwest shore of Ayrshire.

Hugh, as the regional representative of the King and intimately familiar with the climate, offered a plan to Alexander to delay the Norse fleet in Scotland until the Autumn weather turned nasty. And it did on September 30, crushing the Norse fleet against the shoreline rocks. The Scots then attacked the confused Norse on the shore at Largs. The Norse escaped back to Norway in tatters, never to claim the Western Isles again. Alexander awarded Hugh the estate at Crosbie, shown to the right, in appreciation for his contribution to the defeat of the Norse.

References
"History of the Shire of Renfrew," George Crawfurd, Glasgow, 1710.

External links
Clan Crawford Association

People from East Ayrshire
Scottish knights
1195 births
1265 deaths
13th-century Scottish people